LG Optimus L9 is a touchscreen Android 4G smartphone designed and manufactured by LG Electronics. The phone was released on October 31, 2012. The Optimus L9 features Android 4.0 Ice Cream Sandwich. It is upgradable to Android 4.1 Jelly Bean according to LG Electronics Hong Kong on their Facebook Fans Page. The phone is designed to be the successor of LG Optimus L7. The LG Optimus L9 brings many improvements upon its predecessor, including FullHD 1080p video recording, increased screen resolution, increased RAM size and a dual-core processor. In the United States, the Optimus L9 is carried by T-Mobile and MetroPCS in black.

Variants
In different markets, LG offers four different variants of this phone, with model number P760, P765, P768, and P769. The differences are: P760 and P765 are identical except one has NFC while the other does not; P768 has 8 MP camera (others have 5 MP); P769 has 4.5 inch screen and a different processor (others have 4.7 in).

See also
 LG Optimus
 List of LG mobile phones
 Comparison of smartphones

References

Android (operating system) devices
LG Electronics smartphones
LG Electronics mobile phones
Discontinued smartphones